Klee is a German and Ashkenazi Jewish surname. Variations include Kleefeld, Kleeblatt, Kleegman, Kleiman, Kleeman and Kleeberg. In German, it means 'clover' and is possibly a topographical name like Feldman.

According to the Beit Hatfutsot, the name Klee originates from the Greek word Kalonymos, which Jews took as an equivalent for the Hebrew "shem tov", meaning "good name". Klee and Kleemann are recorded as Jewish family names in late 18th-century Alsace in France.  

In France, the name is associated with the Alsatian commune of Katzenthal, near Colmar.

People with the name Klee

 Alfred Klee (1875–1943), prominent Zionist leader
 Bernhard Klee (born 1936), German conductor
 Carsten Klee (born 1970), German footballer
 Ernst Klee (1942–2013), German teacher, writer, and filmmaker of works about the Holocaust
 Esther Eugenie Klee-Rawidowicz (1900–1980), German-Jewish biologist, wife of the Polish-born American Jewish philosopher Simon Rawidowicz (1897–1957)
 Flora Klee-Palyi (1893–1961), Jewish Hungarian illustrator, translator, and editor  
 Heinrich Klee (1800–1840), German theologian
 Jean-Louis Klée (1908–1989), Alsatian spy
 Jean-Paul Klée (1943–), Alsatian poet
 Karl Heinz Klee (1930–2008), Austrian sports official
 Ken Klee (born 1971), American professional ice hockey player
 Miguel Klee (born 1977), Guatemalan football goalkeeper
 Ollie Klee (1900–1977), outfielder in Major League Baseball
 Patricia Klee, American politician
 Paul Klee (1879–1940), German-Swiss painter
 Raymond-Lucien Klée (1907–1944), French philosopher
 Ruth Judith Klee (1901–1942), family friend of Anne Frank
 Victor Klee (1925–2007), mathematician
 Waldemar Gøthrik Klee (1853–1891), Californian horticulturist

People with the name Kleeblatt

 Norman Kleeblatt, curator at the Jewish Museum (Manhattan)

People with the name Kleiman

 Ariel Kleiman (born 1985), Australian director
 Bernard Kleiman (1928–2006), lawyer
 Dave Kleiman (1967–2013), American forensic computer expert
 Devra G. Kleiman (1942–2010), American biologist 
 Johannes Kleiman (1896–1959), Dutch helper of the Frank family
 Mark A. R. Kleiman (born 1951), American academic drug policy authority
 Michael Kleiman, documentary filmmaker 
 Naum Kleiman (born 1937), historian of cinema
 Pascal Kleiman (born 1968), disc jockey
 Steven Kleiman (born 1942), American mathematician
 Vladimir Kleiman (1930–2014), Russian scientist

People with the name Kleeman

Alexandra Kleeman (born 1986), American writer
Jenny Kleeman, Jewish-British documentary film-maker and journalist 
Otto Kleemann (1855–1936), American architect
Wilhelm Kleemann (1869–1969), Jewish banker

People with the name Kleefeld

 Carolyn Mary Kleefeld, American poet and author
 Hans Kleefeld (1929–2016), Canadian designer
 Käte Stresemann (1883–1970), née Kleefeld, German-Jewish Weimar Republic society figure
 Kurt von Kleefeld (1881–1934), German lawyer

People with the name Kleegman

 Sophia Kleegman, Russian American obstetrician, gynecologist, and sex education advocate

References

See also
 Kleefeld
 Kleeblatt
 Kleiman
 Kleeman
 Kleeberg
 Feldman
 Feldmann

Jewish surnames
Yiddish-language surnames
German-language surnames